Moe Mantha may refer to:

 Moe Mantha, Sr. (1933–2015), Canadian ice hockey player and Progressive Conservative Party Member of Parliament for Nipissing
 Moe Mantha, Jr. (born 1961), his son, National Hockey League player and American Hockey League coach